Gillian Vigman (born January 28, 1972) is an American actress, comedian, and screenwriter. She has played Jack Box's Wife in many Jack in the Box commercials, and is a recurring cast member of the sketch comedy series MADtv. Vigman also starred in the ABC comedy Sons & Daughters, and had recurring roles in the sitcoms Suburgatory and New Girl. Since 2020, she has voiced the character of Dr. T'Ana on the animated series Star Trek: Lower Decks.

Early life
Vigman was born in Morristown, New Jersey, to a British mother and American father. Her father was born to Jewish parents, whereas her mother converted to Judaism.

Vigman attended Colgate University, graduating in 1994.

Career
She started her professional comedy career in Chicago working for The Second City. Prior to joining the cast of MADtv, Vigman toured with The Second City National Touring Company in 2000, to launch its 20th anniversary S season.

She first appeared on MADtv in the eighth episode of the eighth season in a sketch called "The Real Bachelor." She is only the second cast member to appear in an earlier season before joining the regular recurring cast. Only Daniele Gaither, who appeared in a sketch in season two before joining the cast in Season Nine, has obtained such a distinction.

Vigman officially joined the cast of MADtv in 2003, as a feature performer, for the ninth season. At the end of Season Nine, in 2004, her contract was not renewed.

She made appearances on several television shows like I Love the '90s, Scrubs, World Cup Comedy and Cupid before starring in the ABC comedy Sons & Daughters, playing the role of Liz Walker. After Sons & Daughters, Vigman appeared on a number of hit shows including According to Jim, Parks and Recreation, and New Girl, before landing the recurring part of Jill Werner on Suburgatory in 2011. Her film credits include The Hangover series, The 40-Year-Old Virgin, After the Sunset, Dragonfly, and Love 101.

She has appeared in various commercials, including for Hanes, Jack in the Box, Chase, Swiffer, Splenda, Esurance, 1-800 Contacts, DirectTV, United Airlines, Rooms to Go, Buick, Real California Milk, and Progressive Insurance.

Filmography

Film

Television

References

External links 

Official ABC site for Sons & Daughters

1972 births
Living people
Actresses from New Jersey
American film actresses
American impressionists (entertainers)
American television actresses
American women comedians
20th-century American actresses
21st-century American actresses
Jack in the Box
People from Morristown, New Jersey
Colgate University alumni
American sketch comedians
American people of British descent
20th-century American comedians
21st-century American comedians